Divaldo Da Silva Teixeira Alves is a Portuguese football manager for Liga 1 club Persik Kediri. He is a UEFA Pro Licence holder.

Career 
A former youth coach and scout at Benfica also youth coach at Atlético do Cacém and Encarnação Olivais Senior team, Alves success came in Indonesia where he first worked as assistant coach of PSMS Medan in 2009, as the club qualified to the quarter finals of the 2009 AFC Cup and semi-finals of 2009 Copa Indonesia. Alves later coached Persebaya 1927 to second place in the 2011-12 Indonesia Premier League he holds the LPI national record with 10 consecutive matches with 2 draws and 8 wins. He also coached Persijap Jepara and Minangkabau staying 3 points from the second position in LPI competition, working with low profile players, Minangkabau was a club named PSP Padang.

In early 2013 Alves was named as the coach of the Malaysia Super League club Negeri Sembilan. However, he left the club in a mutual agreement in May 2013, before end of season.

Alves was appointed as Technical Advisor of Perak in June 2014, succeeding Karl-Heinz Weigang. His role is to work together with head coach Abu Bakar Fadzim in handling the Perak's first team squad. as technical advisor and head coach in September 2014. Season 2017–2018 in Oman the club ended top 6, after Coach Divaldo Alves went out of professional football for one season for private reasons. 
Manager Divaldo Alves has new challenge this time in West of Africa, sign for Sofapaka for the coming season 2019/2020 and the objective is to achieve the top of the table of Kenyan Premier League.

Personal life 
Besides his native Portuguese, Alves is also fluent in Indonesian, Malay, English, and Spanish.

Honours 
Persebaya Surabaya
Malaysia-Indonesia Unity Cup: 2011
Indonesia Premier League
 Runner-Up: 2011–12

References

External links
Profile at MyBestPlay.com

1978 births
Living people
Portuguese football managers